The Aichi small-elevator manufacturing corporation is a manufacturer of vertical transportation systems, mainly elevators and Dumbwaiters. Founded in Aichi, Japan in 1969.
Aichi small-elevator manufacturing corporation makes a speciality of small elevators, dumbwaiter and passenger lifts beside staircases.

History
Aichi small-elevator manufacturing corporation was founded in 1969 under private management.  It was organized in 1974 as a yugen kaisha and 
re-organized in 1976 as a kabushiki gaisha.  The company moved to its present location in 1980.

Products
 Elevators for passenger service.
 Stretcher capable elevators.
 Freight elevators.
 Hydraulic elevators.
 Dumbwaiter (elevator).
 Home elevators.
 Staircase passenger lift.
 Staircase wheelchair lift.

External links
  Official website
  Official website

References

Manufacturing companies of Japan
Vertical transport devices
Japanese brands